The Cosmic Eye is a 1986 American animated science fiction film directed by Faith Hubley and featuring the voices of Dizzy Gillespie, Maureen Stapleton and Jack Warden.

Plot
A trio of homeward-bound space musicians, suffering from acute nostalgia on their space boat The Cosmic Eye, decided to take a turn over the Milky Way and sympathetically helping Earth while watching several films about contacting life in the cosmos and yearning for peace.

Voice cast
Dizzy Gillespie as Musician/Father Time
Linda Atkinson as Musician
Sam Hubley as Musician
Maureen Stapleton as Mother Time
Jack Warden as Rocko

Release
The film was released theatrically in New York City on June 6, 1986.

Reception
Vincent Canby of The New York Times gave the film a mixed review, calling it “an unusually pretty film but, like its title, it's also a bit intimidating.”

Michael Wilmington of the Los Angeles Times gave the film a positive review, writing that it “is as joyous and heartening a movie as you’ll find all year. This eye winks, flutters, stares unabashedly and sees to the heart.”

See also
Moonbird - The 1959 Academy Award for Best Animated Short winner that is featured on the 1986 film

References

External links
 
 

American animated science fiction films
1980s English-language films
1980s American films
Compilation films